Sécheras is a commune in the Ardèche department in the Auvergne-Rhône-Alpes region in southern France. It is around 60 km south of Lyon.

Population

See also
Communes of the Ardèche department

References

Communes of Ardèche
Ardèche communes articles needing translation from French Wikipedia